Juhani Pikkarainen (born 30 July 1998) is a Finnish defender playing for VPS.

Career

Club career
Pikkarainen signed with Kokkolan PV on 11 December 2018 until 2019, with an option to extend the deal until 2020. He then returned to TPS for the 2020 season, signing a deal until the end of 2021.

On 17 November 2021, he signed a contract with VPS for the 2022 season.

References

External links

1998 births
Living people
People from Paimio
Finnish footballers
Finnish expatriate footballers
FC Liefering players
USK Anif players
FC Blau-Weiß Linz players
FC Wacker Innsbruck (2002) players
Kokkolan Palloveikot players
Turun Palloseura footballers
Vaasan Palloseura players
Austrian Regionalliga players
2. Liga (Austria) players
Veikkausliiga players
Association football defenders
Finnish expatriate sportspeople in Austria
Expatriate footballers in Austria
Sportspeople from Southwest Finland